Clan Bissett (Bisey, Byset, Bisset or Bissert) is a Scottish clan. The clan is recognised by the Lord Lyon King of Arms but does not have a clan chief recognised by the Lord Lyon King of Arms, therefore the clan has no standing under Scots Law. Clan Bissett is considered an armigerous clan, meaning that it is considered to have had at one time a chief who possessed the chiefly arms; however, no one at present is in possession of such arms. The surname Bissett is also considered a sept of the Clan Fraser of Lovat.

History

Origins of the clan

The surname Bisset is believed to be of Norman origin and was brought to Scotland when William the Lion returned from captivity in England, accompanied by the Biseys. The Bysets settled in Nottinghamshire and Derbyshire in England. They appear with other Norman families to have successfully established themselves and gained land in Morayshire, Scotland. The power of the family spread and persons bearing the surname witnessed several charters in the 13th and 14th centuries. A charter of Alexander III of Scotland to Paisley Abbey was witnessed by Thomas de Bissat.

The rising fortunes of the family were eclipsed however by a feud with the Earl of Atholl. In 1242 at a tournament held at Haddington, Walter Byset, Lord of Aboyne was defeated by the youthful Earl of Atholl (possibly Padraig, Earl of Atholl). Allegedly, Byset, in a fit of anger murdered the earl while he slept and then set fire to his house to conceal the crime. Walter Byset and his nephew John then fled to Ireland and then to England. The feud followed the two fugitives as a pardon was later granted to the son of the Earl of Atholl for killing some Bysets in Ireland.

Habakkuk Bisset was a lawyer and Writer to the Signet during the reign of James IV of Scotland.

20th and 21st centuries
The principal line of the clan is now that of Bisset of Lessendrum, one of the oldest families in Aberdeenshire.

Clan profile
Motto: (Latin: Abscissa Virescit - English That torn down re-grows)
Crest: The trunk of an oak tree sprouting a fresh Proper.

Castles
The following is a list of castles known to have been in the ownership of the family:
Scotland
 Aboyne Castle, just north of Aboyne, Aberdeenshire, is a tall seventeenth century tower house but there was an earlier stronghold there that was held by the Bissets. 
Maryculter House, seven miles to the south west of Aberdeen was held by the Bissets and Walter Bisset of Aboyne established a preceptory of the Knights Templar at Maryculter in 1225.
 Redcastle, Black Isle, was originally a property of the Bissets that dates from the twelfth century. It was later held by the Clan Fraser of Lovat and then the Clan Mackenzie.
 Beaufort Castle, Beauly was originally held by the Bissets but passed by marriage to the Frasers of Lovat in the thirteenth century.
Kilravock Castle, six miles west of Nairn was also originally a strong hold of the Clan Bisset but passed by marriage to the Clan Rose in the thirteenth century.
Lessendrum, three and a half miles north east of Huntly was the seat of the longest lasting branch of the clan, the Bissets of Lessendrum. 
Upsettlington Castle, near Upsettington (now Ladykirk), Scottish Borders, was the seat of the Bissets of Upsettlington.
Ireland
Glenarm Castle, Glenarm, Northern Ireland
Red Bay Castle, Glenariff, Northern Ireland
Rathlin Castle, County Antrim, Northern Ireland

Peerages
 Barony of The Aird
 Barony of Lessendrum
 Lord Lovat
 Lord Aboyne
 Lord Beauly
 Lord Beaufort
 Lord of the Glynns

References

Further reading
Temple, Rev. William. The Thanage of Fermartyn, quoted on rootsweb.ancestry.com, History of Bissets of Lessendrum 1251-1894

 
Scottish clans
Armigerous clans